Ernest Higginbotham was an English footballer who played in the Football League for Rotherham United.

References

English footballers
Rotherham United F.C. players
English Football League players
Association football midfielders
Year of birth missing